Henry Anthony (16 May 1873 or 20 September 1876 – 13 July 1928) was an English first-class cricketer. He was a right-handed batsman and a right-arm medium-pace bowler who played for Nottinghamshire. He was born in either Old Basford or Arnold, Nottinghamshire.

Anthony made four first-class appearances between 1898 and 1902, in the Nottinghamshire lower-order. Anthony's brother, George and uncle Alfred also played first-class cricket, the brothers partnering each other in the lower order in Henry's final first-class game. Their brother Walter Anthony won a football championship medal with Blackburn Rovers in 1912.

References

1870s births
English cricketers
Nottinghamshire cricketers
English cricketers of 1890 to 1918
People from Arnold, Nottinghamshire
People from Basford, Nottinghamshire
Cricketers from Nottinghamshire
1928 deaths